Roberto A. Mendoza, known as Panoptica, has been one of the figures in the Mexican electronic music scene since the late 1980s, founding bands like electro pos-industrial outfit Artefakto and in the late 1990s being part of the Tijuana-based norteña-meets-techno Nortec Collective. He has also been releasing tracks as Panóptica and it was under this name that English DJ John Peel took notice, inviting him to do one of his Peel sessions for the BBC in 2001. In 2005 Roberto had embarked on finishing two projects, one called "Desierto" and the other "Mendoza", where friends like David J. (Bauhaus, Love and Rockets) lend a hand on bass and guitars. In late 2007 he separated from the Nortec Collective and created the "Nortec Panoptica Orchestra" a band for his live shows. In early 2008 Roberto decided to record a new solo album to push and further develop the electronic sound, working independently from the Tijuana collective and with new musical partners Zoell Farrujia (Ambiente), Benjamin Rivera (Grupo de Acero), Edgar Hernandez (Banda Aguacaliente), Adrian Rodriguez (Koñorteño), and special guests: Javiera Mena, Khan Oral, Yerba Buena. The album was set to be released in March 2010 in Vinyl LP and digital form

References

External links 

Year of birth missing (living people)
Living people
Mexican electronic musicians